One Thing Remains is the third studio album by Canadian hard rock band Default. It was released on October 11, 2005. The album features a more straightforward hard rock sound than the band's previous work, downplaying their characteristic alternative metal elements. "The Memory Will Never Die" was used as one of the theme songs of World Wrestling Entertainment's (WWE) event WrestleMania 23 and WWE's Tribute to the Troops. The album produced three singles, including "Count on Me", which reached number one on the Canadian rock airplay chart and the top 40 on both the Mainstream and Alternative rock charts in the United States. The original demo version of "The Way We Were" was first recorded with Rich Robinson of The Black Crowes as its producer but later re-recorded for the album.

Critical reception
Dennis Fallon of the Centre Daily Times praised the band's sound for mixing rock and pop sounds while also being "heavy". The Provinces Tom Harrison wrote that while the album appears to be acting as "damage control" for the band's second album which "didn't have the hits of the first one", with this album the band "forges boldly ahead as if nothing is wrong" and "sounds heavier and in control."

Track listing

"All Is Forgiven" – 4:08 (Default, Marti Frederiksen, Bob Marlette)
"I Can't Win" – 3:48 (Default, Frederiksen)
"It Only Hurts" – 3:42 (Default, Frederiksen)
"The Way We Were" – 3:28
"Count on Me" – 4:09 (Default, Chad Kroeger)
"Hiding from the Sun" – 3:32 (Default, Frederiksen, Marlette)
"Beautiful Flower" – 3:48 (Default, Frederiksen)
"One Thing Remains" – 2:57 (Default, Frederiksen)
"The Memory Will Never Die" – 4:23 (Default, Frederiksen)
"Get Out of This Alive" – 3:01
"Found My Way Out" – 3:47

Charts

Album

Personnel
P. R. Brown – design
Bryan Coleman – management
Leonard B. Johnson – A&R
John Coster – product manager
Danny Craig – drums
Dave Benedict – bass
Dallas Smith – vocals
Jeremy Hora – guitar, backing vocals
Jake Davies – engineer
Pete Deboer – string engineer
Marti Frederiksen – composer
Benjamin Haber – photography
Chad Kroeger – composer, producer
Stephen Marcussen – mastering
Bob Marlette – audio production, composer, engineer, mixing, producer
Kevin Mills – assistant
Glenn Pittman – assistant
Sid Riggs – digital editing, engineer
Bobby Yang – string arrangements

References

Default (band) albums
2005 albums